Williams-Warren-Zimmerman House, also known as the Cottage-Among-the-Lindens, is a historic home located at Terre Haute, Vigo County, Indiana. It was built between 1849 and 1854, and is a -story, Greek Revival style frame dwelling with a one-story wing. It sits on a stuccoed brick foundation, is sheathed in clapboard siding, and has a gable roof with dormers. The house was moved to its present location in 1874.

It was listed on the National Register of Historic Places in 1980. It is located in the Farrington's Grove Historic District.

References

Individually listed contributing properties to historic districts on the National Register in Indiana
Houses on the National Register of Historic Places in Indiana
Greek Revival houses in Indiana
Houses completed in 1854
Buildings and structures in Terre Haute, Indiana
National Register of Historic Places in Terre Haute, Indiana